Poenomia is a genus of moths of the family Erebidae. The genus was described by Schaus in 1913.

Species
Poenomia berthalis (Schaus, 1906) Brazil
Poenomia frigidalis Dognin, 1914 Peru
Poenomia hiempsal Schaus, 1913 Costa Rica
Poenomia maculata Schaus, 1913 Costa Rica
Poenomia turpis Schaus, 1913 Costa Rica

References

Herminiinae